Club Atlético Juventud (usually referred as Juventud de Pergamino) is a football club from Pergamino in Buenos Aires Province, Argentina. The team currently plays in Torneo Argentino A, which is the regionalised third tier of the Argentine Football Association league system.

Titles
Liga de Pergamino: 6
1973, 1974, 1975, 1977, 2003, Clausura 2004

See also
List of football clubs in Argentina
Argentine football league system

External links
Official Website 

Association football clubs established in 1946
Football clubs in Buenos Aires Province
1946 establishments in Argentina